Szenajda  (German: Schönheide, till 1945) is a village in the administrative district of Gmina Kościerzyna, within Kościerzyna County, Pomeranian Voivodeship, in northern Poland. Prior to 1945 it was in Germany.

For details of the history of the region, see History of Pomerania.

References

Szenajda